Guichen (Gallo: Gischen) is a commune in the Ille-et-Vilaine department in Brittany in northwestern France.

History

Population
Inhabitants of Guichen are called Guichenais in French.

Image gallery

See also
Luc Urbain de Bouexic, comte de Guichen
Communes of the Ille-et-Vilaine department

References

External links

Mayors of Ille-et-Vilaine Association  
Official website 

Communes of Ille-et-Vilaine